Yarlagadda Nayudamma (born 1 June 1947) is a consultant paediatric surgeon from Guntur. Previously, he operated at the Guntur General Hospital where he was the head of the paediatric surgery department. He has performed various complex surgical procedures which have received acclamation from the scientific community and the lay public.

He is the only Indian surgeon to have successfully separated three sets of conjoined twins fused at three different locations - head, thorax-abdomen and pelvis.  All 6 children are leading normal healthy lives. He is also the first Indian surgeon to have successfully operated on a rare congenital anomaly of duplication of stomodeum (double mouth) in December, 1995.

Biography

Yarlagadda Nayudamma was born to parents Yarlagadda Subba Rao and Rangamma in Karamchedu of Prakasam District (then part of Guntur district), A.P. He graduated in medicine in 1970 from Guntur Medical College, acquired the degree of Master of Surgery in General Surgery in 1974 from Rohtak Medical College, specialized in Paediatric Surgery and obtained the degree of M.Ch. in 1977 from All India Institute of Medical Sciences, New Delhi (AIIMS). He held various offices including Vice Principal of Guntur Medical College, Guntur.

Awards 
Dr. Tummala Rambrahmam Research Award for 2002 Awarded by GMCANA, USA. 
Dr. Vulakki Memorial Gold Medal Oration Award - 2003 
Dr. D. J. Reddy Memorial Oration Award - 2003. 
Y. Prabhavathi & Y.S. Prasad Memorial Award for achievement in the field of Pediatric Surgery - 2003. 
Ramineni Foundation - USA - Puraskarams 2004 - Visistha Puraskaram Award. 
Chodavarapu Charitable Trust Puraskaram - 2004. 
Siddhartha Kalapeetham 'Visistha Vyakthi' Award 2005, Vijayawada,A.P. 
World Telugu Federation Award - 2005. 
Rotary Vocational Excellence Award - 2006 Rovex - 2006 
Indian Medical Association 78th National Conference of I.M.A 2003 Ranbaxy Oration.
Dr. B. Shanmukeswara Rao Memorial Oration - 27th Annual Conference of Association of Surgeons of India, A.P. Chapter. 
Dr. E.N.B. Sarma Memorial Oration - 2004 at Andhra Medical College, Visakhapatnam, A.P, India. 
Dr. B. Dharma Rao Memorial Oration Award 2005 B.M.A. & I.M.A. Vijayawada, A.P, India. 
Dr. S.S. Rao Memorial Oration 2005, Indian Medical Association, Chirala, AP, India.
He was conferred the degree of Doctor of Science by the Acharya Nagarjuna University in March 2008.
Padma Shri in 2016.

References

Recipients of the Padma Shri in medicine
1947 births
Living people
People from Prakasam district
20th-century Indian medical doctors
Medical doctors from Andhra Pradesh
Indian paediatric surgeons
All India Institute of Medical Sciences, New Delhi alumni
20th-century surgeons
Acharya Nagarjuna University alumni